Narekavank ("Monastery of Narek", Western Armenian: Nareg) was a tenth-century Armenian monastery in the historic province of Vaspurakan, near the southern shores of Lake Van, in present-day Gevaş district in the Van Province in eastern Turkey. The monastery was one of the most prominent in medieval Armenia and had a major school. The poet Gregory of Narek (Grigor Narekatsi) notably flourished at the monastery. It was abandoned in 1915 during the Armenian genocide, and reportedly demolished around 1951. A mosque now stands on its location.

History

10th-11th centuries
The monastery was founded during the reign of the Artsruni King Gagik I of Vaspurakan (r. 908–43) by Armenian monks who fled the Byzantine Empire due to religious persecution. In the 10th century father Ananias of Narek (Anania Narekatsi, (arm)) founded a school, which became one of the most prominent centers of learning in medieval Armenia. Gregory of Narek (Grigor Narekatsi, 951-1003), a prominent mystical poet, studied and flourished at the monastery, making the "name of the institution immortal". To this day, the monastery is mostly associated with Gregory of Narek. Among others, the historian Ukhtanes studied at the monastery school. During this period, the monastery was among the most prominent in all of Armenia and was also a major center of manuscript production. The earliest surviving manuscript produced at the monastery is a Gospel dated 1069.

Modern period
Armenia was dominated by various foreign powers in the subsequent centuries. The Ottoman Empire gained control of the region by the 16th century. The monastery experienced a revival when in 1707 it was profoundly renovated by Minas vardapet Ghapantsi. In 1812 a bell-tower was constructed within the monastery walls. The two domes were restored in 1843 by the architect Sahrat Memarbashi and his son Movses. In 1858 the monastery was renovated by Hovhannes vardapet. Father Hovsep Rabuni commissioned a khachkar (cross stone), which was placed on the tomb of Gregory of Narek. It depicted the Mother of God carrying Jesus on her lap and Gregory on the foreground.

In 1884 Aristakes vardapet opened a seminary at the monastery and in 1901 an orphanage with a school was founded.

In 1896, during the government-sanctioned Hamidian massacres, the monastery was attacked by Kurds who killed father Yeghishe and 12 monks.

In the 19th and early 20th centuries the monastery was visited by Western missionaries. Reverend Harrison Gray Otis Dwight described Narekavank a "celebrated monastery". In 1900 the American journal The Missionary Herald wrote that the monastery's orphanage had 25 to 30 boys, while the monastery school was "by far the largest and most advanced school in the province outside the city [of Van], this village unlike most others, having had some sort of a school for several years."

In the early 20th century the monastery was surrounded by residential houses and various buildings for economic purposes. A 1911 photo by the ethnographer Yervand Lalayan shows "peasants with oxen plowing a field directly beneath its walls." The American missionary Herbert M. Allen (1865–1911) wrote in 1903 that

Architecture
The monastic complex contained two churches: St. Sandukht and Surb Astvatsatsin ("Holy Mother of God"). The mausoleum of Gregory of Narek was located to the east of the St. Sandukht church. The church of Surb Astvatsatsin had a "domed hall" design, and was located south of St. Sandukht. In 1787 vardapet Barsegh built a rectangular, four-columned gavit (narthex), on the tombs of Hovhannes vardapet (the brother of Gregory) and the philosopher Ananias of Narek. In front of the gavit's western entrance a three-storey bell-tower was built in 1812.

Destruction and current state
The monastery ceased to function during the Armenian genocide of 1915 which resulted in the Armenian population of the region being exterminated. According to Sevan Nişanyan it was demolished around 1951, at the same period that an official order for the demolition of the Holy Cross Cathedral of Aghtamar was issued. The village of Narek is now largely Kurdish-populated and is known as Yemişlik in Turkish and Nerik in Kurdish. The scholar James R. Russell, who visited the monastery site in 1994 and 1997, was told by local Kurdish villagers that a 10th-century khachkar (cross stone) was destroyed by the Turkish police.

The monastery is completely destroyed. In the early 2000s "there were still some remnants of an archway of the monastery." A mosque now stands where the monastery once stood.

In December 2008 the Turkish-Armenian architect Zakarya Mildanoğlu announced that the Turkish government had decided to rebuild Narekavank, among some other half-ruined or destroyed churches and monasteries in eastern Turkey. In September 2010, Mildanoğlu compiled a list of around 90 Armenian churches and monasteries in the Lake Van region including Narekavank. He recommended that the Turkish government take the necessary measures to preserve them.

See also 
Other prominent churches in the Lake Van region:
 Holy Cross Cathedral on Aghtamar Island
 Varagavank

References 

Armenian churches in Turkey
Oriental Orthodox congregations established in the 10th century
Christian monasteries established in the 10th century
Destroyed churches in Turkey
History of Van Province
Demolished buildings and structures in Turkey
Former churches in Turkey
Ruined churches in Turkey
Kingdom of Vaspurakan
Buildings and structures demolished in 1951